Typhoon is a 1940 American Technicolor south seas adventure film directed by Louis King and starring Dorothy Lamour and Robert Preston. It was nominated for an Oscar for Best Visual Effects (Farciot Edouart, Gordon Jennings, Loren L. Ryder).

Plot
A young girl abandoned on a South Seas island falls in love with a worthless seafarer.

Cast
 Dorothy Lamour as Dea
 Robert Preston as Johnny Potter
 Lynne Overman as Skipper Joe
 J. Carrol Naish as Mekaike
 Chief Thundercloud as Kehi
 Frank Reicher as Doctor
 John Rogers as Bar keep
 Paul Harvey as Dea's father
 Norma Gene Nelson as Dea, as a child
 Angelo Cruz as Kehi's bodyguard
 Jack Carson as Mate
 Al Kikume as Cook

References

External links

1940 films
1940 adventure films
American adventure films
Films directed by Louis King
Films scored by Friedrich Hollaender
Paramount Pictures films
1940s English-language films
1940s American films